Hamangia may refer to:
 Hamangia, the former name of Baia, Tulcea, a commune in Tulcea County, Romania 
 Hamangia culture 
 Hamangia (river), a river in Tulcea County, Romania